Prunus angustifolia, known commonly as Chickasaw plum, Cherokee plum, Florida sand plum, sandhill plum, or sand plum, is a North American species of plum-bearing tree.  It was originally cultivated by Native Americans before the arrival of Europeans. The species' name angustifolia refers to its narrow leaves.  It became the official state fruit of Kansas in 2022.

Description
It is "twiggy" in nature, and has a scaly, almost black bark. Its branches are reddish with thorn-like, small side branches. The flowers have five white petals with reddish or orange anthers. The plums are cherry-like and tend to be quite tart until they fully ripen. They ripen in late summer. It requires low to medium amounts of water to grow, and dry, sandy or loose soil. It grows best in areas with regular sunlight or areas of partial shade. In sunny areas, it will be more dense and colonize thickly. In areas of partial shade, it will be thinner and less dense, and each plant will be more spread out.

P. angustifolia is very difficult to distinguish from P. umbellata, with which it hybridizes easily.

Taxonomy
American plum (Prunus americana Marsh.) hybridizes naturally with P. angustifolia to produce P. × orthosepala Koehne.

Distribution and habitat
P. angustifolia is widespread across much of the eastern and central United States from Florida west as far as New Mexico and California, north to Nebraska, Illinois, and New Jersey, with a few isolated populations in northern Michigan. The species grows in dry and sandy soils, such as open woodlands, woodland edges, forest openings, savannahs, prairies, plains, meadows, pastures, and roadsides. It is listed by the U.S. Department of Agriculture as an endangered species in the state of New Jersey.

Ecology 
It is used by many species as a larval host, including the black-waved flannel moth, the blinded sphinx, the cecropia moth, the coral hairstreak, the elm sphinx, the hummingbird clearwing moth, the imperial moth, the Io moth, the polyphemus moth, the promethea silkmoth, the red-spotted purple, the small-eyed sphinx, the spring azure, the striped hairstreak, and the tiger swallowtail.

The fruit is eaten by various animals, and the foliage provides cover for nesting sites.

Uses 
Chickasaw plums tend to bloom early in the spring before many other plants bloom, and require very little maintenance; as a result, they are often used in ornamental horticulture. They are often found growing wild along highways, especially in the southern U.S.

The -in. edible fruits change from red to yellow when fully ripe. They may be eaten raw and are often made into jellies. Because of its attractive bark, small leaves and thin branches, Chickasaw plum is also sometimes used for bonsai.

References

External links
 
 
 Oklahoma Biological Survey
 USDA Prunus Angustifolia
 Virginia Tech Department of Forest Resources and Environmental Conservation
 Floridata Prunus Angustifolia
 The University of Texas at Austin Lady Bird Johnson Wildflower Center
 Kansas Forest Service

angustifolia
angustifolia
Trees of the United States
Plants described in 1785They grow around Beaver County Oklahoma and Lipscomb county Texas